Dudley ‘Tal’ Stokes (born 22 June 1962) is a Jamaican bobsledder and Bobsled coach. He competed at the 1988, 1992, 1994 and the 1998 Winter Olympics.

References

1962 births
Living people
Jamaican male bobsledders
Olympic bobsledders of Jamaica
Bobsledders at the 1988 Winter Olympics
Bobsledders at the 1992 Winter Olympics
Bobsledders at the 1994 Winter Olympics
Bobsledders at the 1998 Winter Olympics
Place of birth missing (living people)